Virgibacillus olivae is a Gram-positive and spore-forming bacterium from the genus of Virgibacillus which has been isolated from waste water from olives from La Roda in Spain.

References

Bacillaceae
Bacteria described in 2007